Teriha Sekisui House Arena is an arena  in Island City, Fukuoka, Fukuoka. Groundbreaking and construction began on February 1, 2017, and opened on December 1, 2018.

Facilities
Main arena - 3,703 sqm
Sub arena - 1,786 sqm
Budojo
Training room
Kids room

Attendance records
The record for a basketball game is 5,618, set on February 2, 2019, when the Alvark Tokyo defeated the Rizing Zephyr Fukuoka 84-74.

References

Basketball venues in Japan
Indoor arenas in Japan
Sports venues in Fukuoka Prefecture
Sports venues completed in 2018
2018 establishments in Japan
Buildings and structures in Fukuoka
Rizing Zephyr Fukuoka